Americium(III) bromide or americium tribromide is the chemical compound composed of americium and bromine with the formula AmBr3, with americium in a +3 oxidation state. The compound is a crystalline solid.

References

Americium compounds
Bromides
Actinide halides